Timothy Hyman  (born 1946) is a British figurative painter, art writer and curator. He has published monographs on both Sienese Painting and on Pierre Bonnard, as well as most recently The World New Made: Figurative Painting in the Twentieth Century. He has written extensively on art and film, has been a regular contributor to The Times Literary Supplement (TLS) and has curated exhibitions at the Tate, Institute of Contemporary Arts and Hayward galleries. Hyman is a portraitist, but is best known for his narrative renditions of London. Drawing inspiration from artists such as Max Beckmann and Bonnard, as well as Lorenzetti and Brueghel, he explores his personal relationship, both real and mythological, with the city where he lives and works. He employs vivid colours, shifting scale and perspectives, to create visionary works. He was elected an RA in 2011.

Life and career
Hyman was born in Hove, Sussex, in 1946, and brought up in London. He attended the Slade School of Fine Art between 1963 and 1967. Since 1980 he has had ten London solo exhibitions. His earliest publications were on film (8½ as an Anatomy of Melancholy, Sight and Sound, 1974) and on literature (The Modus Vivendi of John Cowper Powys, 1972). He began to publish articles on painting in the mid-seventies in The London Magazine, and was a contributing editor to Artscribe. In 1979, he curated the controversial exhibition Narrative Paintings at the ICA in London and the Arnolfini in Bristol. In 1980 and 1982, he was a Visiting Professor in Baroda, (Vadodara) India, and completed several extensive British Council lecture tours. Timothy Hyman has been Artist in Residence at Lincoln Cathedral, Sandown Racecourse and, most recently, at Maggie's Cancer Caring Centres (exhibited at the Royal Academy in 2015). Since 1982, he has been married to the author Judith Ravenscroft. He lives in North London.

Hyman has written on the work of many artists including Pierre Bonnard and the painters of the Sienese School as well as more contemporary artists, such as Howard Hodgkin R.B. Kitaj and the Indian painter Bhupen Khakhar Since 1990, he has been a regular contributor to the Times Literary Supplement and has written on a variety of subjects including: Ernst Ludwig Kirchner Henry Darger and German Romanticism. Hyman has also written extensively on film, including articles on Fellini, Andrei Tarkovsky and Derek Jarman In 1998, his monograph on Bonnard (judged by The New Criterion as 'by far the best thing ever written about the painter') was published by Thames & Hudson, and, in the same year, his book on Bhupen Khakhar was published in India. In 2003 his widely admired monograph Sienese Painting (Thames & Hudson) centred on Ambrogio Lorenzetti and other artists of the fourteenth and fifteenth century, and was described in the TLS by David Ekserdjian as "an unimprovable union of exceptionally acute looking, magical prose, and authoritative scholarship". In 2016 Thames & Hudson published The World New Made: Figurative Painting in the Twentieth Century, described by Svetlana Alpers as "exhilarating to read"; and by Christopher Allen as "a delight, deeply but lightly erudite, intimate, written with exquisite intelligence". According to Linda Nochlin it "constructs a new and convincing scenario for the history of twentieth century painting ... wonderfully concrete in detail and wide-ranging in scope."

Hyman and Roger Malbert curated the Hayward Gallery touring exhibition Carnivalesque in 2000.

In 2001, along with the cultural historian Patrick Wright, Hyman was lead curator for the acclaimed Stanley Spencer retrospective at Tate Britain. He also co-curated the major exhibition British Vision at the Museum of Fine Arts, Ghent, in 2007–2008.

Hyman is also well known for his lectures that investigate the tangents and marginalia of art history. He has been a visiting lecturer in art at the Slade School of Fine Art, Glasgow School of Art, Central Saint Martins and the Royal College of Art for many years as well as lecturing at the Working Men's College, the Tate, the National Gallery, London, and the Museum of Modern Art in New York.

Exhibitions 
 1979 Narrative Paintings. Institute of Contemporary Art, London & Arnolfini, Bristol.
 1981/83/85 Blond Fine Art, London
 1982/83/86/88 Whitechapel Open, London.
 1984 A Singular Vision. South London Art Gallery, London.
 1985 Human Interest. Cornerhouse, Manchester.
 1986 Self Portrait. Bath Festival and touring.
 1988 The Subjective City. Barbican Art Gallery, London.
 1991 EASTinternational, Norwich.
 1993 Castlefield Gallery Manchester
 1994 Chemould, Bombay, India
 1997 Contemporary British Figurative Painting. Flowers East, London.
 2000 Mid River: Paintings and Drawings of a Decade, Austin/Desmond Fine Art, London
 2006 The Man Inscribed with London, curated by Nurit David, Gallery of the Artists' Studios, Tel Aviv
 2009 The Man Inscribed with London, Austin/Desmond Fine Art, London
 2015 A Year with Maggie's, Royal Academy of Arts, London
 2018 Overlapping Circuits, collaborative mural with Luci Eyers, Transition Gallery, London
 2019 Tree of Lives, collaborative mural with Perienne Christian and Luci Eyers, BAGT Studios, London

Awards and prizes 
 1984–85 Artist-in-Residence, Westfield College London
 1992 Artist-in-Residence, Sandown Racecourse
 1992 Leverhulme Award
 1993 Honorary Research Fellow, University College London
 1995 Rootstein/Hopkins Award
 1998 Wingate Foundation Award
 2007 BP Travel Award (National Portrait Gallery, London)
 2018 Awarded grant from Royal Literary Fund

Publications (selected) 
Bonnard, Thames & Hudson, 1998 
Bhupen Khakhar, Chemould Publications and Mapin Publishing, 1998, 
Carnivalesque Timothy Hyman, Roger Malbert & Malcolm Jones. Published by National Touring Exhibitions (Hayward Gallery); and University of California Press.2001 
Stanley Spencer Tate Publishing. London. 2001. 
Sienese Painting, Thames & Hudson, 2003. .
 Fifty Drawings, Lenz Books. 2010. .
 A Year with Maggie's, Royal Academy of Arts 2015, 
 The World New Made: Figurative Painting in the Twentieth Century, Thames & Hudson, 2016.

References

External links 

 
 
 "Sexuality & The Self" article on the late Bhupen Khakhar at queerarts.org
 "Cranach's Golden Age" article in The Times Literary Supplement by Timothy Hyman, 16 April 2008
 "Marsden Hartley's 'Late Courage'" from the Sienese Shredder.
 Austin Desmond
 Royal Academy website
 Catalogue of 2009 exhibition with texts by Tess Jaray and Richard Zimler
 Profile on Royal Academy of Arts Collections

20th-century English painters
English male painters
21st-century English painters
21st-century English male artists
English writers
English contemporary artists
1946 births
People from Hove
Living people
Art writers
Alumni of the Slade School of Fine Art
Royal Academicians
20th-century English male artists